Abdulwahab Al-Rushaid (Arabic: عبدالوهاب الرشيد) (born Abdulwahab Moh'd Al-Rushaid, October 29, 1984) is a Kuwaiti economist and politician. He is an elected board member of Kuwait Economic Society and the vice-chairman of the board.
 
He is a Minister of Finance and Minister of State for Economics Affairs and Investments since 28 of December 2021. As finance minister, now heads the Kuwait Investment Authority, which manages the country’s $700 billion sovereign wealth fund, designed to reduce dependence on oil-related investments.

Kuwaiti general election 2016 
Al-Rushaid was a candidate in the Kuwaiti General Election 2016 and ranked at the 22nd place in the third constituency by 1,345 votes.

External links 
 Kuwait Economic Society

References 

Finance ministers of Kuwait
Gulf University for Science and Technology alumni
Kuwait University alumni
Kuwaiti economists
1984 births
Kuwaiti businesspeople
Living people
21st-century Kuwaiti businesspeople